The 1847 Alabama gubernatorial election took place on August 2, 1847, in order to elect the governor of Alabama. Democrat Reuben Chapman won his first term with a 56% majority.

Candidates

Democratic Party
Reuben Chapman, member of the U.S. House from 1835 to 1847.

Whig Party
Nicholas Davis, candidate in 1831 and 1845. Member of the Alabama House of Representatives from 1819 to 1820.

Election

References

Alabama gubernatorial elections
1847 Alabama elections
Alabama
August 1847 events